is a train station in Ide, Tsuzuki District, Kyoto Prefecture, Japan, operated by West Japan Railway Company (JR West). It has the station number "JR-D16".

Lines
Tamamizu Station is served by the Nara Line.

Layout
The station consists of two side platforms serving one track each. A POS terminal is installed at the station. IC card tickets can be used at this station.

Platforms

History
Station numbering was introduced in March 2018 with Tamamizu being assigned station number JR-D16.

Passenger statistics
According to the Kyoto Prefecture statistics and Ide Town statistics, the average number of passengers per day is as follows.

Adjacent stations

See also
 List of railway stations in Japan

References

External links

  

Railway stations in Japan opened in 1896
Railway stations in Kyoto Prefecture